Ain el-Turck (Arabic : عين الترك ) (literally "Fountain of the Turks") is the capital of Ain el-Turck District located about fifteen kilometers from Oran in the north-west of Algeria. The district contains nine municipalities. It now host an important seaside resort.

It also gives its name to one of the beaches in the region of Oran.

History 

Centuries ago, Ain el Turk was a plain called El Eurfa which extends from St Roch till Les Andalouses. Over the centuries, the population of El Eurfa plain (known later as Ain el Turck) has significantly increased. Two types of people lived there and cohabited, nomadic people who practice transhumance, and sedentary or sedentarized tribes who practiced agriculture and beekeeping. The nomads wandered between the plains of El Eurfa, Boutlelis and Messreghinn, except in some special cases they did not go beyond the Sabkha in the South and the forest Madagh in the West. They lived together and traded with each other. These sedentary people sold their products at Mers el-Kebir and Oran, they also sold their products to nomadic tribes, but most of the time they swapped their products with sheep as they supply them with meat and wool.

General Aspect of the city in 1831

Seaway and Roads 
In 1831, the area where the village would be built was a kind of a cul-de-sac from the only major road, which was rather a road that connected les Andalouse and Mers-el-Kebir and Oran via Bousfer called "la Route des Crêtes" which was very rocky and took new directions at Ain Khadija (later, the road was named 'Ploteau road'), joining Ain el Turck at the small village Naqous, so named in Arabic because of the bells of the first church in the area "St. Anthony of Padua" (the word 'Naqous' means bell, in Arabic).

However, there were many other ways relied the village to St Roch, Cape Falcon, Coralès, to Les-Andalouses, the Daya and Bousfer.
Seaway has been used to link the city with Oran and Mers-el-Kebir, as there were links between these 2 cities when not at war, we know only that Turkish troops used the sea when coming to pick up the taxes

Water Sources 
There was in the plain of what will become Ain el Turck at least eight sources of water:
 The two sources of Ain Ouzel and Cape Falcon
 Ain Ouansar near the farm Emeral
 Source of St Maurice
 Ain el Turck
 Ain Atrouss (farm Clairefontaine-Navarre)
 Bally source (barranco Bouisseville)
 St Rock source

Ecology 
Apart from some woods and groves located down the hills, vegetation was predominantly dwarf palms (Duma), Alfa tufts, some diss, lentisk (especially at the dunes), juniper, thorns, herbs, agave, Reeds and a multitude of flowers and plants which were used as forage.
Forest trees especially pine and cedar are common south of the village down the mountain.

Indigenous people cultivated fruit trees such as almond, fig, the Jujubie, and vine also
But the most widespread plant was the pear used as a hedge of protection that had the triple advantage
 Requires no maintenance
 Provide fruit
 Ensure effective protection of the house or the pen

One could find edible plants as a type of wild green asparagus, beautiful sea that was called "the wild white beans", chestnuts, the fennel, chicory, watercress.
There are also many mushrooms but they are not consumed (according to botanists, we could count on more than 30 species of which at least a dozen were edible)
Flowers were particularly numerous. Hawthorn and the arbutus, the aloe el the Asphodèles. The gladioli. Blueberries, worries, the bolts of gold, tulips and daisies wild vinaigrette, Lesjacinihes wild, the ephemeral poppy, lavender,

And the first indigenous families in Ain el Turck (the Touil, Bouchiba, Ali arbi. Boukhatem and Belazrag in trouville..)

See also
List of lighthouses in Algeria

Climate

References

Communes of Oran Province